Rusty LaRue (born December 10, 1973) is an American basketball coach and former professional player. He was a multi-sport athlete who played basketball, baseball, and football at Wake Forest University. LaRue played in the National Basketball Association (NBA) for the Chicago Bulls, Utah Jazz and Golden State Warriors. He won an NBA championship with the Bulls in 1998.

LaRue began his coaching career after his playing retirement in 2004. He was an assistant coach for the Wake Forest Demon Deacons basketball team under head coaches Dino Gaudio and Jeff Bzdelik from 2009 to 2014. He served as the head coach of the West Forsyth High School basketball team since 2015. LaRue retired from coaching in 2019 and is now the Chief Operations Officer of Dairi-O Restaurants.

High school and college 
LaRue attended Northwest Guilford High School in Greensboro, North Carolina, where, in addition to being an honors student, he earned All-State honors in baseball, basketball, and football.  As a senior in 1991, he was named North Carolina Athlete of the Year, and he attracted the attention of many colleges before choosing to attend Wake Forest, where he planned to play both basketball and football in the ACC.  LaRue also played collegiate baseball for one season, becoming just the second player in ACC history to play three sports in the same year. He was 1 of only 4 players to beat Duke at Cameron Indoor Stadium all four years, the others being Tim Duncan, Tyler Hansbrough, and Danny Green.

LaRue arguably had his most collegiate success on the football field.  As a freshman quarterback in 1992, he was a member of Wake Forest's football team that took home an Independence Bowl victory, and during his senior year he broke eight NCAA records for passing, including the record for most completions in one game (55).  However, LaRue was a solid basketball player, as well, as he helped his teammates reach the NCAA Tournament for four consecutive seasons. He also finished second in school history in three-point field goals made, and he finished first all-time in three-point field goal percentage.

Professional playing career
After college, LaRue decided to focus exclusively on basketball because there were more opportunities to play professionally.  Though he was not drafted by an NBA team, he earned a spot on the Chicago Bulls' roster in 1997 after honing his craft in the minor leagues for one season.  During the 1997–98 NBA season, LaRue averaged 3.5 points per game in limited playing time and earned an NBA Championship ring in the process.  He would receive more minutes during the next season after Michael Jordan, Scottie Pippen, Dennis Rodman, and Steve Kerr left the team, and he averaged 4.7 points and 1.5 assists per game while making 33.7% of his three-point field goal attempts.  However, the Bulls cut ties with LaRue during the 1999–2000 NBA season as they continued their post-dynasty rebuilding process. He returned to the minor leagues and was selected to the All-Continental Basketball Association (CBA) Second Team while playing for the Idaho Stampede in 2000. He signed with the Russian team CSKA Moscow in 2000.

After a year in Russia, LaRue returned to America and briefly played for the NBA's Utah Jazz during the 2001–02 NBA season (signed January 28, 2002) before going back to the European leagues, where he joined the Italian team Pallacanestro Varese.  In 2003, he returned to the NBA, this time as a member of the Boston Celtics, but he was waived before appearing in a regular season game; he would appear in four games for the Golden State Warriors towards the end of the season.

Coaching career 
LaRue served as head men's basketball coach at Greensboro College in 2004-05 and later was athletics director and basketball coach at Forsyth Country Day School in Winston-Salem.

In 2009, he re-joined the Wake Forest men's basketball program as an assistant coach under Dino Gaudio. He was retained as an assistant by new head coach Jeff Bzdelik in 2010. He was released by Wake Forest's new coach, Danny Manning in 2014.

On June 30, 2015, LaRue was named the new men's basketball coach at West Forsyth High School. West Forsyth was attended by Chris Paul, another former Wake Forest player. LaRue retired from coaching in 2019 and is now the Chief Operations Officer of Dairi-O Restaurants.

NBA career statistics

Regular season 

|-
| style="text-align:left;background:#afe6ba;"| 1997–98†
| style="text-align:left;"| Chicago
| 14 || 0 || 10.0 || .408 || .250 || .625 || .6 || .4 || .2 || .1 || 3.5
|-
| style="text-align:left;"| 1998–99
| style="text-align:left;"| Chicago
| 43 || 6 || 17.0 || .359 || .337 || 1.000 || 1.3 || 1.5 || .8 || .1 || 4.7
|-
| style="text-align:left;"| 1999–00
| style="text-align:left;"| Chicago
| 4 || 1 || 32.3 || .349 || .143 || .714 || 2.5 || 2.8 || 1.8 || .0 || 9.3
|-
| style="text-align:left;"| 2001-02
| style="text-align:left;"| Utah
| 33 || 0 || 16.4 || .395 || .340 || .857 || 1.5 || 2.2 || .5 || .2 || 5.8
|-
| style="text-align:left;"| 2003-04
| style="text-align:left;"| Golden State
| 4 || 0 || 5.5 || .333 || 1.000 || .500 || .8 || .5 || .5 || .0 || 1.0
|-
| style="text-align:left;"| Career
| style="text-align:left;"|
| 98 || 7 || 16.0 || .376 || .318 || .841 || 1.3 || 1.6 || .6 || .1 || 5.0

Playoffs 

|-
| style="text-align:left;"| 2001-02
| style="text-align:left;"| Utah
| 4 || 0 || 13.3 || .375 || .400 || .600 || 1.5 || 1.5 || .2 || .0 || 5.0
|-
| style="text-align:left;"| Career
| style="text-align:left;"|
| 4 || 0 || 13.3 || .375 || .400 || .600 || 1.5 || 1.5 || .2 || .0 || 5.0

References

External links
 Official site
 Wake Forest profile
 Career stats at Basketball-Reference
 NBDL stats at Basketball-Reference

1973 births
Living people
American expatriate basketball people in France
American expatriate basketball people in Italy
American expatriate basketball people in Russia
American men's basketball players
Asheville Altitude players
Basketball coaches from North Carolina
Basketball players from Winston-Salem, North Carolina
Chicago Bulls players
College men's basketball head coaches in the United States
Connecticut Pride players
Golden State Warriors players
Greensboro Pride men's basketball coaches
High school basketball coaches in the United States
Idaho Stampede (CBA) players
Pallacanestro Varese players
Paris Racing Basket players
PBC CSKA Moscow players
Point guards
Undrafted National Basketball Association players
Utah Jazz players
Wake Forest Demon Deacons baseball players
Wake Forest Demon Deacons football players
Wake Forest Demon Deacons men's basketball coaches
Wake Forest Demon Deacons men's basketball players
United States Basketball League players